Bryan Keith Fair (born August 12, 1960) is an American academic; his research has focused on race and constitutional law.  Since 2000, he has been the Thomas E. Skinner Professor of Law at the University of Alabama School of Law.  He presently serves as the Chairman of the  Board of Directors of the Southern Poverty Law Center.  He is the author of Notes of a Racial Caste Baby: Colorblindness and the End of Affirmative Action.  He completed his undergraduate studies at Duke University, and after studying law at the UCLA School of Law, was admitted to the California Bar in 1986.

Selected works

References

20th-century American lawyers
African-American academics
American legal scholars
Duke University alumni
Living people
Southern Poverty Law Center
University of Alabama faculty
UCLA School of Law alumni
California lawyers
African-American lawyers
1960 births
20th-century African-American people
21st-century African-American people